Tugali elegans is a species of large sea snail or limpet, a marine gastropod mollusc in the Family Fissurellidae, the keyhole limpets and slit limpets.

References

 Powell A W B, William Collins Publishers Ltd, Auckland 1979 
 Photo

Fissurellidae
Gastropods of New Zealand
Gastropods described in 1843
Taxa named by John Edward Gray